The eleventh season of The Real Housewives of New Jersey, an American reality television series, was broadcast on Bravo from February 17, 2021. It is primarily filmed in New Jersey; its executive producers are Amy Kohn, Jessica Sebastian, Jordana Hochman, Lauren Volonakis, and Andy Cohen.

The Real Housewives of New Jersey focuses on the lives of returning cast members Teresa Giudice, Melissa Gorga, Dolores Catania, Margaret Josephs, Jennifer Aydin and Jackie Goldschneider.

Production and crew
Amy Kohn, Jessica Sebastian, Jordana Hochman, Lauren Volonakis, and Andy Cohen are recognized as the series' executive producers; it is produced and distributed by Sirens Media.

Production on the series was set to begin in March 2020, but was delayed due to the COVID-19 pandemic. Production began in July 2020.

Cast and synopsis
In January 2020, former fulltime housewife and recurring cast member Danielle Staub announced she would be departing the series for the second time. Giudice, Gorga, Catania, Josephs, Aydin and Goldschneider returned. In addition to this, Michelle Pais, through her connection with Giudice, makes regular guest appearances throughout the season.

Episodes

References

External links

2021 American television seasons
New Jersey (season 11)